The Worshipful Company of Chartered Accountants in England and Wales is one of the livery companies of the City of London. The organisation became a livery company in 1977. The Company promotes "honourable practice" of accounting and awards prizes to students in the field. It also supports general charities. The company ranks eighty-sixth in the order of precedence for livery companies. Its motto is True and Fair.

Founding 
Formal letters patent for the creation of the livery company were presented on 25 July 1977 by the lord mayor of London. Its first master was James M. Keith, member of the City's Court of Common Council and chief commoner for 1976–1977.

It was one of several companies formed in the 1970s, when concerns were raised that existing livery companies had few connections to the modern financial services industry in London.

Charities 
In 1992, the Worshipful Company of Chartered Accountants in England and Wales launched "Chartered Accountants in the Community", a programme which placed senior accountants onto the management committees of charities. The scheme aimed to place 20 to 30 attachments a year, with a focus on providing advice and professional expertise to charities, rather than day-to-day bookkeeping. The livery company had previously focused on making donations to support overseas training and rewarding student achievement.

As of December 1992, the company had 100 members. At the time, former master Richard Wilkes told the Financial Times, "We do not have a large endowment. Instead of money, we've got talent."

Dinners 
In July 2021, The Telegraph reported that up to a dozen business leaders were boycotting a dinner banquet at Mansion House hosted by the Worshipful Company of Chartered Accountants, because guests were being required to wear face masks and use NHS Test and Trace QR codes to enter the event.

Financial Services Group of Livery Companies 
The company is a member of the Financial Services Group of Livery Companies, the other 11 members of which are the Worshipful Companies of Actuaries, Arbitrators, International Bankers, Chartered Secretaries and Administrators, Insurers, Information Technologists, City of London Solicitors, Management Consultants, Marketors, Tax Advisers, and World Traders.

References

External links
 The Chartered Accountants' Company

Accountants in England and Wales
Accounting in the United Kingdom
1977 establishments in England